The 1907–08 season was the 9th season for FC Barcelona.

Squad

Results

References

External links

FC Barcelona seasons
Barcelona